Natannethuwa Dinna is a 2016 Sri Lankan Sinhala comedy film directed by Kalyana Chandrasekara and produced by A. Parister. It stars Bindu Bothalegama and Roshan Pilapitiya in lead roles along with Rodney Warnakula and Cletus Mendis. Music composed by Sarath Wickrama. It is the 1245th Sri Lankan film in the Sinhala cinema.

Plot

Cast
 Bindu Bothalegama as Veera / Sira
 Cletus Mendis as President
 Rodney Warnakula as Premayaa
 Roshan Pilapitiya as Nishan Porapitiya
 Madhi Panditharatne as Neela
 Ronnie Leitch as Gunda
 Milinda Perera as Jewelry owner
 Ariyasena Gamage as Wimale
 Dayasiri as Jailer 
 Devinda as Police officer

Soundtrack

References

External links

2016 films
2010s Sinhala-language films